Sturgeon Bay is a city in and the county seat of Door County, Wisconsin, United States. The population was 9,646 at the 2020 Census. The city is well-known regionally for being the largest city of the Door Peninsula, after which the county is named.

History
The area was originally inhabited by the Ho-Chunk and Menominee. The town is known in the Menominee language as Namāēw-Wīhkit, or "bay of the sturgeon". The Menominee ceded this territory to the United States in the 1831 Treaty of Washington. After that, the area was available for white settlement.

The community was first recorded as Graham in 1855 but, in 1857, the state legislature organized it as the town of Ottumba. Subsequently, the name was reverted to Graham and, in 1860, a petition was submitted to the county board to change the community's name to that of the adjacent bay. A company of volunteer firefighters was established in 1869. In 1874, Sturgeon Bay was incorporated as a village. It became a city in 1883, and the police department was founded that year. In 1891, Charles Mitchell Whiteside (1854–1924), a member of the Wisconsin Assembly, sponsored a bill that merged the community of Sawyer with Sturgeon Bay. 

The city is locally known for the Sturgeon Bay Bridge at Michigan Street, which at the time of its 1931 opening was the second across the bay and carried the former route of WIS 17 (now WIS 42 and WIS 57/78.

Sturgeon Bay was one of a number of cities in the Midwest to assist with production during World War II.

In 1943, many streets received new names. The former names of some streets are stenciled into older sidewalks.

 Historical photos

Geography

Sturgeon Bay is at the natural end of Sturgeon Bay. The Sturgeon Bay Ship Canal was built across the remainder of the Door Peninsula. It is one of several cities along Green Bay, including Green Bay, Marinette and Escanaba, Michigan, and along Lake Michigan north of Manitowoc and south of Manistique, Michigan.

Distance 

Stevens Hill 
Stevens Hill is a populated place within the city of Sturgeon Bay, just to the northeast of the downtown. The top of the hill has the highest elevation in the city. It is within Big Hill Park, which is 13.2 acres in area and is used for mountain biking, picnicking, and sledding.

Climate
Sturgeon Bay has a humid continental climate (Köppen: Dfb).

Demographics

2010 census
At the 2010 census, there were 9,144 people, 4,288 households and 2,385 families. The racial make-up was 95.1% White, 1.0% African American, 0.9% Native American, 0.6% Asian, 1.0% from other races, and 1.4% from two or more races. Hispanic or Latino of any race were 2.7% of the population.

There were 4,288 households, of which 24.3% had children under the age of 18 living with them, 42.5% were married couples living together, 9.7% had a female householder with no husband present, 3.5% had a male householder with no wife present, and 44.4% were non-families. 38.9% of all households were made up of individuals, and 17.5% had someone living alone who was 65 years of age or older. The average household size was 2.07 and the average family size was 2.74.

The median age was 45.2 years. 19.8% of residents were under the age of 18; 7.4% were between the ages of 18 and 24; 22.5% were from 25 to 44; 31% were from 45 to 64; and 19.2% were 65 years of age or older. The sex make-up of the city was 48.1% male and 51.9% female.

2000 census
At the 2000 census, there were 9,437 people, 4,048 households and 2,432 families residing in the city. The racial make-up of the city was 97.22% White, 0.33% Black or African American, 0.78% Native American, 0.37% Asian, 0.02% Pacific Islander, 0.46% from other races, and 0.82% from two or more races. 1.28% of the population were Hispanic or Latino of any race.

There were 4,048 households, of which 28.7% had children under the age of 18 living with them, 42.81% were married couples living together, 9.0% had a female householder with no husband present, and 39.9% were non-families. 35.0% of all households were made up of individuals, and 15.8% had someone living alone who was 65 years of age or older. The average household size was 2.26 and the average family size was 2.92.

23.5% of the population were under the age of 18, 7.6% from 18 to 24, 26.6% from 25 to 44, 23.7% from 45 to 64, and 18.7% were 65 years of age or older. The median age was 40 years. For every 100 females, there were 92.4 males. For every 100 females age 18 and over, there were 88.0 males.

The median household income was $31,935 and the median family income was $45,084. Males had a median income of $31,879 and females $21,414. The per capita income was $18,899. About 5.5% of families and 7.7% of the population were below the poverty line, including 11.2% of those under age 18 and 8.3% of those age 65 or over.

Municipal services
 Police — 12 patrol officers, 4 sergeants and nine cars with a supporting staff of five.
 Fire — 14 full-time, 15 part-time firefighters and 11 vehicles operating out of two stations.

Transportation

Major highways
  WIS 42 Northbound travels to Egg Harbor, Fish Creek, Sister Bay, Ellison Bay and Gills Rock. South it travels to Algoma, Kewaunee, Two Rivers, and Manitowoc, where it connects to I-43.
  WIS 57 southbound connects to Green Bay and connects with Baileys Harbor and Jacksonport northbound.
 CTH-S

Bridges across the bay 
 Ahnapee & Western Railroad Bridge (built 1887, rebuilt in 1894 by the Ahnapee and Western Railway to accommodate trains, demolished entirely by 1970)
 Michigan Street Bridge (built 1929-31)
 Oregon Street Bridge (built 2006-08)
 Bay View Bridge (built 1976-78)

Airport
Sturgeon Bay is served by Door County Cherryland Airport , which is off of Wisconsin Highway 42 and 57 on County Highway PD.

Water
Sturgeon Bay has a medium-sized port, and has received vessels as long as 307 feet and a deadweight tonnage carrying capacity of 64,457 metric tonnes. A major shipbuilding and repair facility and the Coast Guard Station Sturgeon Bay is located at the port. Most traffic comes from pleasure boats. The dock at Graham Park is able to accommodate cruise boats.

Education

The community is served by Sturgeon Bay High School and has a satellite campus of Northeast Wisconsin Technical College.

Sturgeon Bay has three elementary schools, Sawyer, Sunrise and Sunset. The middle school, T.J. Walker Middle School, is connected to the high school. St. Peter's Lutheran School is a pre-K to 8th grade school of the Wisconsin Evangelical Lutheran Synod. Three former schools, Saint Peter and Paul, Corpus Christi and Saint Joseph, have combined to form Saint John Bosco. The Door County Charter School was in operation from 2002 to 2005.

In 2000–2019 public school statistics, high school enrollment declined 21.0%, middle school enrollment 27.1% and elementary school enrollment 13.7%.

Media 
Sturgeon Bay had the Door County Advocate (now a subsidiary of Green Bay Press-Gazette) and numerous radio stations in the Door County Radio Market. No television stations originate from Sturgeon Bay and WFRV's and WLUK's remote-operated weather cameras are the only full-time presence of Green Bay stations in the city.

Entertainment and recreation

The community has one movie theater, Sturgeon Bay Cinema 6, and a professional regional theatre, the Third Avenue Playhouse. Every year the town hosts Steel Bridge Songfest, where nationally known musicians and songwriters perform. Past performers include Jackson Browne, Jane Wiedlin of The Go-Go's and Pat MacDonald of Timbuk3.

The county owns  of fairgrounds (John Miles County Park) and maintains  of the Ahnapee Trail extending into the city limits. It exits the city to reach its northern terminus at Potawatomi State Park. The Wisconsin DNR owns or maintains easements on two public properties in the city; 20 acres along Big Creek and 80 acres south of Strawberry Lane.

Notable people

 Gideon Winans Allen, Wisconsin state representative
 Robert C. Bassett, U.S. presidential advisor
 Eddie Cochems (1877-1953), "Father of the Forward Pass" 
 Frank N. Graass, Wisconsin state representative
 Chris Greisen, Milwaukee Iron quarterback (AFL)
 Nick Greisen, Denver Broncos linebacker (NFL)
 Stuart Hagmann, film and television director
 Bernard Hahn, Wisconsin state representative
 Arthur G. Hansen (1925-2010), engineer, former president of Georgia Institute of Technology (1969–71) and Purdue University (1971-82), and chancellor of the Texas A&M University System (1982–85).
 Joseph Harris, Wisconsin state senator
 Lawrence Johnson, Wisconsin state representative
 Al C. Kalmbach, founder of Kalmbach Publishing
 Doug Larson, newspaper columnist and writer
 Pat MacDonald, solo troubadour of stomp musician and former member of Timbuk 3
 Edward S. Minor, U.S. representative
 Conrad P. Olson, Oregon Supreme Court justice
 Henry J. Overbeck, Wisconsin state representative
 Anna Augusta Von Helmholtz-Phelan, professor, author
 Casey Rabach, Washington Redskins center (NFL)
 Dennis A. Reed, Wisconsin state representative
 Hallie H. Rowe, Wisconsin state representative
 Paul J. Schlise, U.S. Navy admiral
 Alexander B. Whitman, Wisconsin state senator
 Jarvis T. Wright, Wisconsin state representative
 Randy Wright, Green Bay Packers quarterback (NFL)

Gallery

References

External links

 City of Sturgeon Bay
 Sturgeon Bay Visitor Center
 Live webcam of Michigan Street Bridge
 Sanborn fire insurance maps: 1885 1891 1898 1904 1911 1919

Cities in Wisconsin
Cities in Door County, Wisconsin
County seats in Wisconsin